María Paulina Dávila (born 18 December 1988), is a Colombian actress.

Biography 
Dávila was born in Medellín, Colombia, and raised in Santa Marta, where she lived until she finished high school. She then moved to Bogotá to obtain her Visual Arts degree from the Pontifical Xavierian University.

Filmography

References

External links 
 

1988 births
Living people
Colombian telenovela actresses
Colombian television actresses
Colombian film actresses
21st-century Colombian actresses